Bay City is a city and county seat of Bay County in the U.S. state of Michigan, located near the base of the Saginaw Bay on Lake Huron. As of the 2020 census, the city's population was 32,661, and it is the principal city of the Bay City Metropolitan Statistical Area, which is included in the Saginaw-Midland-Bay City Combined Statistical Area. The city, along with nearby Midland and Saginaw, form the Greater Tri-Cities region of Central Michigan.

The city is geographically divided by the Saginaw River, and travel between the east and west sides of the city is made possible by four modern bascule-type drawbridges: Liberty Bridge, Veterans Memorial Bridge, Independence Bridge, and Lafayette Avenue Bridge, which allow large ships to travel easily down the river. The city is served by MBS International Airport, located in nearby Freeland, and James Clements Municipal Airport.

History

Leon Tromblé is regarded as the first settler within the limits of Bay County, in an area which would become Bay City. In 1831, he built a log cabin on the east bank of the Saginaw river.
Bay City was first established in 1837 and was incorporated as a city in 1865. In 1834 John B. Trudell built a log-cabin near the present corner of Seventeenth and Broadway. Trudell later purchased land that extended from his residence north along the river to what later became the location for the Industrial Brownhoist, making him the first permanent resident of what has become Bay County. Bay City became the largest community in the county and the location of the county seat of government. Most of the county's agencies and associations are located here. The city shares common borders with Essexville and the townships of Bangor, Frankenlust, Hampton, Merritt, Monitor, and Portsmouth.

Bay City was originally known as "Lower Saginaw," and fell within the boundaries of Saginaw County. On June 4, 1846, the Hapton, or Hampton, Post Office opened to service Lower Saginaw. The community was placed in Bay County, when the county was organized in 1857. It was at this time that the name was changed to Bay City. The Post Office changed its name to Bay City on March 22, 1858.

While Saginaw had the first white settlement in this area in 1819, larger ships had difficulty navigating the shallower water near the Saginaw settlement. Due to this fact, many of the early pioneers moved to Lower Saginaw as it became clear its deeper waters made it a better location for the growth of industry which relied on shipping. By 1860, Lower Saginaw had become a bustling community of about 2,000 people with several mills and many small businesses in operation. In 1865, the village of Bay City was incorporated as a city. Rapid economic growth took place during this time period, with lumbering, milling, and shipbuilding creating many jobs. The early industrialists in the area used the Saginaw River as a convenient means to float lumber to the mills and factories and as a consequence amass large fortunes. Many of the mansions built during this era are registered as historical landmarks by the state and federal government.

In 1873, Charles C. Fitzhugh, Jr., a Bay City pioneer, and his wife, Jane, purchased land and built a home on property bounded by Washington, Saginaw, Ninth and Tenth Streets, which later became the location for City Hall. During this time, Washington Avenue was primarily developed with residential homes. Businesses were concentrated along Water Street near the Saginaw River. As time went on, businesses started to expand along Washington Avenue. In 1891, the Fitzhughs sold the land to the City of Bay City for $8,500 "to be used for the erection of a City Hall and offices and for no other purposes whatever."

Until 1905, the City of Bay City was limited to the east bank of the Saginaw River. when West Bay City was annexed.

During the latter half of the 19th century, Bay City was the home of several now-closed industries including many sawmills and shipbuilders. The Defoe Shipbuilding Company, which ceased operations December 31, 1975, built destroyer escorts, guided missile destroyers, and patrol craft for the United States Navy and the Royal Australian Navy. To maintain this strong Naval heritage, the Saginaw Valley Naval Ship Museum worked through the Naval Sea Systems Command to bring the USS Edson (DD-946) to Bay City as a museum ship. It was finally delivered to its temporary home in Essexville, Michigan, on August 7, 2012. Another important part of the city's industrial history is Industrial Brownhoist, which was well known for its construction of large industrial cranes.

There was a majority German section of Bay City called Salzburg. However, most people in Bay City were not German and the German-descended minority became the focus of extreme nativism and xenophobia. Pastors introduced English-language sermons for the first time in that part of town in response; however, it did not catch on and sermons in Salzburg remained mostly German. The Salzburghers demanded that the rest of Bay City recognize them as Americans first and German-American second; nevertheless, hostility towards them continued. 
 The governor of Michigan at the time, Albert Sleeper, sought support from the German-American community; however, anti-German sentiment in Michigan was so widespread that this proved to be a costly mistake. Even before the declaration of war against Germany, anti-German and pro-British sentiment were dominant in Michigan, as a result, hundreds of young men from Michigan had gone across the border to Canada to join the Canadian Armed Forces so as to be a part of the war effort.

Notable events

On December 23, 1906, Bay City's premier hotel, the Fraser House, burned to the ground.

Bay City's unusual Third Street Bridge was damaged by a freighter on June 17, 1976. The following morning, when the swing span was operated, one half crashed into the Saginaw River blocking all riverine traffic. A river crossing was never reinstated at that location.

On December 10, 1977, a deadly fire claimed the lives of 10 at the Wenonah Hotel (Wenonah Park Apartments) in downtown Bay City. The hotel had been built on the site of the Fraser House, which had also succumbed to a fiery end. The Wenonah Hotel was located at the corner of Center Ave and Water Street, the current site of the Delta College Planetarium. Built in 1907, the four-storey Wenonah Hotel had been converted into apartments at the time of the fire. Strong winds and cold weather hampered the efforts of the fire department. There was some controversy over the cause of the fire (arson, electrical, or grease fire) and it remains the deadliest fire in Bay County history.

On Christmas Eve, 1979, a large Bay City department store of long standing, Oppenheim's, was destroyed by fire.

In September 1990, the tankship MV Jupiter was unloading gasoline at the Total Petroleum Terminal. A passing cargo ship, moving at excessive speed, created a wake that caused Jupiter to break free of its berth. A fire and explosion ensued, and one man drowned. There was considerable legal action taken, ultimately resulting in an adjudication that was subsequently appealed by the owners of Buffalo. The findings of the Court of Appeals upheld the original decision, which assigned 50% of the responsibility to Buffalo (for her excessive speed), 25% to the dock operator (for rotten wood pilings) and 25% to Jupiter (for improper procedures in unloading her cargo).

In January 2009, Bay City's wholly owned municipal power company, Bay City Electric Light and Power, installed a "limiter" device to restrict the receipt of power to the home of Marvin Schur, a 93-year-old customer who had failed to pay an outstanding bill in excess of $1,000. The Bay City Electric Light and Power policy was to install the limiter, and to notify the customer by trying to collect the amount due. City employees failed to knock on the door, and it was later found that Schur had a check already made out and had failed to mail it. Schur died from hypothermia in his home a few days later. The day following his death, Bay City Electric Light and Power removed the limiters from all households. It was later learned that Schur had willed his estate, estimated by his family to be in excess of $500,000, to Bay Regional Medical Center.

On October 12, 2010, the historic 113-year-old City Hall sustained significant damage as the result of an attic fire which caused the sprinkler system to run for nearly two hours. Most of the damage to the building was water damage from the sprinkler system and water used to fight the fire. The fire started in the midst of a $1.6 million roofing project. After an investigation, it was determined that a worker was using a grinder to cut off bolts in the area where the fire started, and sparks from the work started the blaze. Fire crews were on the scene for nearly five hours fighting the hard-to-access fire.

Geography
Despite declining population, Bay City remains (by a narrow margin over Port Huron) as the largest U.S. city by population on or near Lake Huron, much smaller than the largest cities on the other four Great Lakes: (Chicago, Toronto, Cleveland, and Thunder Bay).

Bay City, along with Saginaw, and Midland make up the Tri-Cities Area, a sub-region of Flint/Tri-Cities. Bay City is sometimes regarded as being part of the greater Thumb of Michigan Area, which is also a sub-region of the Flint/Tri-Cities.

Neighborhoods
 West Bay City is a section of the city on the West side of the Saginaw River that was a former city.
 The Center Avenue Historic District is an area of the city with more than 250 buildings on the National Historic Register, many of them being old houses built during the lumber boom era in the state.

Business districts
 Banks Business District – Runs along Marquette Avenue from Ohio Street north to Harry S. Truman Parkway
 Broadway Avenue Business District – Extending from Lafayette Avenue south to McGraw Avenue
 Columbus Avenue Business District – From Washington Ave to Bay Medical Center Hospital
 Downtown Bay City – Between Madison Avenue and the Saginaw River.
 Johnson Street Business District – From Center Ave to Woodside St.
 Lafayette/Salzburg/Kosciuszko Business District – Extends along Salzburg east to Kosciuszko (Lafayette turns into Kosciuszko).
 The Midland Street Historic District – Located on the West side of the city near the banks of the river. Home to many popular bars in the city.
 Industrial Districts – Morton Street, Harrison Street, Woodside Avenue, and the Marquette Industrial Center. Home to companies such as: General Motors Powertrain, SC Johnson & Son, Carbone of America/Ultra Carbon Division, Kerkau Manufacturing, Gougeon, and York Electric
Bay City Town Center area (not located within the city limits, but in the adjoining township of Bangor Township) – Wilder Road at State Street Road. Other stores in area include Wal-Mart and The Home Depot
Water Street – home to Michigan's largest antique district
Uptown Bay City - located along the Saginaw River, just south of Veteran's Bridge.

Climate
This climatic region is typified by large seasonal temperature differences, with warm to hot (and often humid) summers and cold (sometimes severely cold) winters. According to the Köppen Climate Classification system, Bay City has a humid continental climate, abbreviated "Dfb" on climate maps.

Demographics

2020 census
As of the census of 2020, there were 32,661 people, and 14,417 households. The racial makeup of the city was 89.6% White, 2.7% Black, 0.2% Native American, 0.5% Asian, 0.2% Native Hawaiian and Pacific Islander, and 6.2% from two or more races. Hispanic or Latino of any race were 10.1% of the population.

There were 14,417 households. The average household size was 2.25, and the average family size was 3.04.

4.8% of residents were under the age of 5; 21.6% of residents were under the age of 18; 14.6% of residents were under the age of 65; 52.3% of residents were female.

The median income for a household in the city was $41,959. The per capita income for the city was $25,141. About 23.6% of persons were in poverty.

2010 census
As of the census of 2010, there were 34,932 people, 14,436 households, and 8,546 families residing in the city. The racial makeup of the city was 89.7% White, 3.5% Black, 0.6% Native American, 0.5% Asian, 1.8% from other races, and 3.9% from two or more races. Hispanic or Latino of any race were 8.5% of the population.

There were 14,436 households, of which 31.7% had children under the age of 18 living with them, 37.0% were married couples living together, 16.6% had a female householder with no husband present, 5.6% had a male householder with no wife present, and 40.8% were non-families. 33.7% of all households were made up of individuals, and 11.3% had someone living alone who was 65 years of age or older. The average household size was 2.38, and the average family size was 3.04.

The median age in the city was 35.8 years. 24.9% of residents were under the age of 18; 9.7% were between the ages of 18 and 24; 27.2% were from 25 to 44; 25.8% were from 45 to 64; and 12.3% were 65 years of age or older. The gender makeup of the city was 48.7% male and 51.3% female.

2000 census
As of the census of 2000, there were 36,817 people, 15,208 households, and 9,322 families residing in the city. The racial makeup of the city was 91.19% White, 2.72% Black, 0.74% Native American, 0.53% Asian, 0.01% Pacific Islander, 2.47% from other races, and 2.33% from two or more races. Hispanic or Latino of any race were 6.72% of the population.

There were 15,208 households, out of which 30.2% had children under the age of 18 living with them, 42.4% were married couples living together, 14.7% had a female householder with no husband present, and 38.7% were non-families. 32.9% of all households were made up of individuals, and 12.8% had someone living alone who was 65 years of age or older. The average household size was 2.38 and the average family size was 3.04.

In the city, the population was spread out, with 25.5% under the age of 18, 9.4% from 18 to 24, 30.5% from 25 to 44, 20.5% from 45 to 64, and 14.1% who were 65 years of age or older. The median age was 35 years. For every 100 females, there were 92.9 males. For every 100 females age 18 and over, there were 88.6 males.

The median income for a household in the city was $30,425, and the median income for a family was $38,252. Males had a median income of $32,094 versus $21,494 for females. The per capita income for the city was $16,550. About 10.3% of families and 14.6% of the population were below the poverty line, including 19.1% of those under age 18 and 10.5% of those age 65 or over.

Economy

Top employers
According to Bay City's 2022 Comprehensive Annual Financial Report, the top ten employers in the city are:

Michigan Sugar is also based in Bay City.

Arts and culture

Bay City is well known in Mid-Michigan for its numerous festivals and celebrations which take place during the summer months. Among them are the River Roar, St. Stan's Polish Festival, the Bay City Fireworks Festival, and the River of Time living history reenactment. Many of these events take place along one or more banks of the Saginaw River, often in Wenonah Park on the east bank or the larger Veterans Memorial Park on the west bank.

The Bay County Historical Museum, located on Washington Avenue, is the designated repository for the records of the Patrol Craft Sailors Association and also contains numerous displays on local and regional history. Over the past several years, the museum has expanded significantly. It is housed in the former armory building on Washington Avenue, adjacent to the historic City Hall.

The Bay County Library System includes two public libraries located in Bay City, the Alice & Jack Wirt Public Library and Sage Public Library.

The official Bay City flag is blue with the city logo on it. It has been changed from the original design.

The Hell's Half Mile Film and Music Festival is held annually in September. The festival features a mix of independent films with live indie music.

Sites of interest
 Appledore Tall Ships
 Studio 23/The Arts Center
 State Theatre
 Delta College Planetarium & Learning Center
 Bay County Civic Arena
 The Bay County Historical Museum
 Bay City State Recreation Area
 Saginaw Valley Naval Ship Museum (US Navy)

Sports 
Bay City is the home to the Tri-City Ice Hawks of the United States Premier Hockey League.

Government
Bay City has a Commission-Manager form of government. The Mayor, who is elected to a four-year term, is the presiding officer of the City Commission and has the power to appoint some board and commission members, with the approval of the City Commission. The Mayor of Bay City is Kathleen Newsham, who has served in that capacity since January 2016. The City Commission has nine members, one from each of the city's nine wards. City Commissioners serve four-year terms and term limited to two consecutive terms. The terms of the Commissioners are staggered; the even-numbered wards are elected together (in years 1999, 2003, 2007, etc.), and the odd-numbered wards are elected together (in years 2001, 2005, 2009, etc.). City operations are managed by the City Manager, who is chosen by the City Commission.

Representatives
The City of Bay City is located in the following districts:  
 8th U.S. Congressional District – Representative Dan Kildee (D)
 96th State House District – State Rep. Timothy Beson (R)
 35th State Senate District – State Sen. Kristen McDonald Rivet (D)

Education

Primary/secondary education

Bay City Public Schools operates seven elementary schools, two middle schools, and three high schools.
 Bay City Central High School
 Bay City Western High School
 Bay City Eastern High School
 T. L. Handy Middle School
 Bay City Western Middle School
 McAlear-Sawden Elementary School
 Auburn Elementary School
 Hampton Elementary School
 Kolb Elementary School
 MacGregor Elementary School
 Mackensen Elementary School
 Washington Elementary School
 
Bangor Township Schools operates one high school, three middle schools, one elementary school, one preschool, and one virtual school.
 John Glenn High School
 Christa McAuliffe Middle School
 Central Elementary School
 Lincoln Elementary School
 West Elementary School
 North Preschool
 Bangor Township Virtual School

Essexville Hampton Public Schools operates one high, school one middle school, and two elementary schools.
 Garber High School
 Cramer Junior High School
 Verellen Elementary School
 Bush Elementary School
 
Bay Area Catholic Schools operates four elementary schools, one middle school, and one high school.
 All Saints Central High School

Bay-Arenac Community High School operates a charter alternative secondary school.
 Bay-Arenac Community High School

Mosaica Education Inc. operates a charter school, Bay County Public School Academy, serving grades kindergarten through 8th grade.

The Wisconsin Evangelical Lutheran Synod has three grade schools in Bay City: Bethel Lutheran School (Pre-K-8), St. John's Lutheran School (Pre-K-8), and Trinity Lutheran School (Pre-K-8).

The Bay-Arenac Intermediate School District also operates a career center in the area.

Colleges
 Delta College – Located in nearby University Center, with an off-campus location in downtown Bay City
 Saginaw Valley State University – Located in nearby University Center

Media
The city's main newspaper is The Bay City Times.

Bay City is also part of the Flint-Saginaw-Bay City television market, and the Saginaw-Bay City-Midland radio market.

Infrastructure

Transportation

Major highways

: This short freeway was once a segment of US 23. It is now a connector freeway between I-75 and M-13.

Bridges
Four modern bascule bridges allow transportation across the Saginaw River, which separates the East and West sides of Bay City. Lafayette Avenue Bridge, opened in 1938, carries M-13 and M-84 over the river. The Veterans Memorial Bridge, opened in 1957, carries M-25 over the river. Independence Bridge, opened in 1976, carries Truman Parkway over the river, replacing the earlier Belinda Street Bridge (built in 1893). Liberty Bridge, opened in 1990, connects Vermont Street (on the west side of the river) and Woodside Avenue (on the east side).

In December 2016, the Bay City commission approved the sale of the Independence and Liberty bridges to a United Bridge Partners, a private company, for a total of $5. Part of their agreement states that the company will cover the cost of repairing Liberty Bridge and Replacing Independence Bridge.

Notable people

 Bob Allman – Chicago Bears player (1936) (Bay City Central HS)
 Emil Anneke – German Forty-Eighter and US politician
 Robert Armstrong (1890–1973) - actor, best known for starring role in King Kong
 Rolf Armstrong (1889–1960) – painter and pin-up artist
 Edmund Arnold – father of modern news design
 Warren Avis – founder of Avis Rent A Car
 Howie Auer — Philadelphia Eagles player (1933)
 James A. Barcia – U.S. Representative, state representative, and state senator.
 Gary Bautell – military radio broadcaster with the American Forces Network
 Lester O. Begick - Michigan state legislator and businessman
  James G. Birney (1792–1857) - presidential candidate 1844 and 1848 Liberty Party, a founder of Bay City
 Ruth Born (1925–2020) - All-American Girls Professional Baseball League player
 Nathan B. Bradley - first mayor of Bay City, U.S. Representative, state senator
 Betsy Brandt - actress, Breaking Bad, The Michael J. Fox Show
 Eric Devendorf – McDonald's All-American basketball recruit from Bay City Central HS, former starter at Syracuse University
 Mary L. Doe- (1836-1913) - suffragette 
 Spoke Emery – Major League Baseball player
 Eric Esch – Super Heavyweight Champion boxer, kickboxer, and martial artist
 Troy Evans (b.1977) – NFL linebacker, Houston Texans, New Orleans Saints
 John Garrels – silver and bronze Olympic medal winner
 Sanford M. Green, Michigan jurist and politician
 Ernie Gust – Major League Baseball player
 Harriet Hammond (1899–1991) - silent-film actress
 Bill Hewitt – Chicago Bears 1932–1936, Philadelphia Eagles 1937–1939, Phil-Pitt Steagles, Pro Football Hall of Fame
 George W. Hotchkiss - nineteenth century lumber dealer and journalist
 Alex Izykowski – 2006 Winter Olympics bronze medalist in short track speed skating
 Edward Jablonski (1923–2004) - author, music archivist and aviation-aerial warfare historian
 Jim Kanicki – Cleveland Browns, and New York Giants 1960–62 (Bay City Central HS)
 Thomas G. Kavanagh - Michigan Supreme Court justice
 Bruce LaFrance – Tantric musician
 Bob LaLonde - Wyoming state representative
 John List – mass murderer
 George Kid Lavigne – boxer, world lightweight champion 1896, and inductee of International Boxing Hall of Fame (1998)
 Madonna (born 1958) – singer-songwriter, actress, member of the Rock and Roll Hall of Fame, Grammy and Golden Globe award winner, was born in Bay City; she grew up in Rochester Hills
 Terry McDermott – 500m speed skating gold medalist in Innsbruck 1964 Winter Olympics
 John McGraw – businessman, co-founder of Wenona, now part of Bay City, Cornell University philanthropist
 Tyler McVey (1912–2003) - actor
 Isaac Marston - Chief Justice of the Michigan Supreme Court
 Richard R. Murray - founder of Equity Schools Inc., inventor of Cristo Rey Network school model
 James Joseph Raby – Rear Admiral, USN.
 Emil F. Reinhardt (1888–1969) - Major General, US Army, commander of 69th Infantry Division during WWII; first US commander to make connection with allied Russian troops
 Trenton Robinson - safety, Michigan State football player and 2012 NFL Draft pick
 Doug Sharp –  2002 Olympic bronze medal winner
 Robert Rechsteiner (Rick Steiner) and Scott Rechsteiner (Scott Steiner) – professional wrestlers
 Doug Taitt (1902-1970) - MLB outfielder
 Annie Edson Taylor  – first person to go over Niagara Falls in a barrel, and live to tell the tale
 Bob Traxler – U.S. Representative, state representative
Charles B. Warren (1870–1936) - Distinguished Service Medal recipient, U.S. Ambassador to Japan and Mexico
 Dennis Wirgowski – NFL player 1970–1973 New England Patriots and Philadelphia Eagles 
Elizebeth Thomas Werlein (1883–1946), conservationist of the French Quarter of New Orleans.
 Patrick Yandall – jazz guitarist
 Frederick Morrell Zeder – Automotive Hall of Fame member; engineer for Allis Chalmers, Willys, and Chrysler

In popular culture
The Bay City Rollers, a Scottish band, were named after this city after the band randomly threw a dart at a map.

The singer Madonna, who was born in Bay City, referred to her birthplace as "a little, smelly town in Northern Michigan" for which she has had great affection on national television. Mike Buda, former Mayor in the 1990s, commented: "Madonna was absolutely right", explaining that air pollution from the gas refinery and a neighboring beet sugar plant was in fact so bad that the EPA forced the industries involved to pay a cash settlement to families, like those of Madonna’s grandmother Elsie Fortin, with homes in the Banks neighborhood.

The story of Bay City's refusal to have a commemoration sign about the singer was described in a book Madonnaland (2016) by Alina Simone. The sign was subsequently posted in 2022 near her birthplace, the former Mercy Hospital, now known as Bradley House.

Sister cities

 Ansbach, Bavaria, Germany
 Goderich, Ontario, Canada
 Lomé, Togo
 Poznań, Poland

References

External links

 City of Bay City, Michigan website
 Bay City Convention & Visitors Bureau
 Bay Area Chamber of Commerce – Bay City
 

 
Cities in Bay County, Michigan
County seats in Michigan
Saginaw River
Populated places established in 1837
1837 establishments in Michigan
Superfund sites in Michigan
Michigan State Historic Sites in Bay County